Julio César Salvá (born 18 May 1987) is an Argentine professional footballer who plays as a goalkeeper for Atlético de Rafaela.

Career
Salvá started his career with Quilmes's academy. He departed to join Primera B Metropolitana's Estudiantes in 2008. Thirty-five league appearances followed, with his final game coming against Villa Dálmine on 2 March 2013. During his time with Estudiantes, Salvá was loaned out on two occasions - to Once Tigres in 2011 and to Justo José de Urquiza in 2012. In June 2013, Salvá was signed by Acassuso. He remained with the third tier team for five seasons, participating in a total of one hundred and nineteen matches. Salvá joined Primera B Nacional side Deportivo Morón in 2017. In February 2021, Salvá left Morón to join fellow league club Güemes.

Ahead of the 2022 season, Salvá signed with Atlético de Rafaela.

Career statistics
.

References

External links

1987 births
Living people
Sportspeople from Buenos Aires Province
Argentine footballers
Association football goalkeepers
Primera B Metropolitana players
Primera Nacional players
Estudiantes de Buenos Aires footballers
Asociación Social y Deportiva Justo José de Urquiza players
Club Atlético Acassuso footballers
Deportivo Morón footballers
Atlético de Rafaela footballers